Archibald Campbell was a member of the Wisconsin State Senate from 1878 to 1879. He was a Republican.

References

Republican Party Wisconsin state senators
19th-century American politicians
Year of birth missing
Year of death missing